Honeybees usually collect nectar, pollen, or both from the following species of plants, which are called honey plants, for making honey.

Acanthaceae (Acanthus family)
Avicennia nitida Jacq. or Avicennia germinans (Black mangrove)

Aceraceae (Sapindaceae) (Maple family)
 Acer rubrum L. (Red maple)
 Acer saccharinum L. (Sugar maple)
 Acer spicatum Lam. (Mountain maple)
 Acer pseudoplatanus L. (Sycamore maple)

Agavaceae  (Agave family)
 Agave sisalana Perrine ex Engelm. (Sisal)

Alstroemeriaceae
 Alstroemeria cunea Vell.

Amaranthaceae   (Amaranth family)
 Alternanthera brasiliana Kuntze
 Alternanthera dentata (Moench) Stuchlik ex R.E.Fries
 Alternanthera polygonoides R.Br. ex Sweet
 Froelichia humboldtiana Seub.
 Froelichia lanata  Moench
 Gomphrena canescens R.Br.
 Gomphrena demissa Mart.
 Gomphrena gardneri Moq.

Amaryllidaceae   (Amaryllis family)
 Allium cepa L.
 Allium sativum L.
 Allium schoenoprasum L.

Anacardiaceae
 Anacardium occidentale L.
 Anacardium humile A.St.-Hil.
 Astronium fraxinifolium Schott
 Lithraea molleoides Engl.
 Mangifera indica L.
 Myracrodruon urundeuva M.Allemão
 Schinus molle L.
 Schinus terebinthifolius Raddi
  Schinopsis brasiliensis Engl.
 Spondias lutea L.
 Spondias mombin L.
 Spondias tuberosa Arruda
 Tapirira guianensis Aubl.
 Tapirira marchandii Engl.

Apiaceae (Parsley and carrot family)
 Apium graveolens L.
 Daucus carota L.
 Pastinaca sativa L.
 Petroselinum crispum Hoffm.

Apocynaceae (Dogbane family) 
All the plants of this family are found in the tropics and subtropics.
 Aspidosperma cylindrocarpon Müll.Arg.
 Aspidosperma dasycarpon A.DC.
 Aspidosperma macrocarpon Mart.
 Aspidosperma parvifolium A.DC.
 Aspidosperma polyneuron A.DC.
 Aspidosperma populifolium A.DC.
 Aspidosperma pruinosum Markgr.
 Aspidosperma pyrifolium Mart.
 Hancornia speciosa Gomes
 Peschiera affinis Miers
 Rhodocalyx rotundifolia Müll.Arg.
 Tabernaemontana fuchsiaefolia A.DC.

Aquifoliaceae (Holly family)
 Ilex decidua Walter
 Ilex glabra A.Gray
 Ilex opaca Aiton
 Ilex theezans Mart.
 Ilex verticillata A.Gray

Araliaceae (Aralia and ivy family)
 Didymopanax macrocarpum Seem.
 Didymopanax vinosum Marchal

Asclepiadaceae
 Asclepias tuberosa L.

Arecaceae (Palm family)

 Acrocomia aculeata Lodd. ex Mart.
 Attalea speciosa Mart.
 Roystonea elata (Bartr.) F.Harper
 Sabal palmetto Lodd. ex Schult.f.
 Syagrus romanzoffiana (Cham.) Glassman (= Cocos romanzoffiana  Cham., or Arecastrum romanzoffianum (Cham.) Becc.).
 Trithrinax campestris (Burmeist.) Drude & Griseb.

Asteraceae  (Aster, daisy, sunflower family)
 Ambrosia polystachya DC.
 Baccharis dracunculifolia DC..
 Baccharis genistelloides Pers.
 Baccharis gracilis DC.
 Baccharis halimifolia L.
 Baccharis ligustrina DC.
 Baccharis platypoda DC.
 Baccharis punctulata DC.
 Baccharis serrula  Sch.Bip.
 Baccharis sessifolia L.
 Baccharis tridentata Vahl
 Bidens cernua L.
 Bidens pilosa L.
 Cichorium intybus L.
 Cirsium arvense (L.) Scop. (= Carduus arvensis, or Cirsium incanum)
 Cirsium vulgare (Savi) Ten. (= Carduus vulgaris, Carduus lanceolatus, or Cirsium lanceolatum)
 Centaurea biebersteinii (Jaub. et Spach) Walp.
 Centratherum punctatum Cass.
 Cosmos sulphureus Cav.
 Echinops sphaerocephalus L.
 Eremanthus sphaerocephalus Baker
 Eupatorium itatiayense Hieron.
 Eupatorium maculatum L.
 Eupatorium maximiliani Schrad. ex DC.
 Eupatorium purpureum L.
 Eupatorium squalidum DC.
 Helianthus annuus L. (Sunflower)
 Helianthus tuberosus L. (Jerusalem artichoke)
 Karelinia caspia (Pall.) Less.
 Liatris spicata Willd.
 Mikania cordifolia Willd.
 Mikania hirsutissima DC.
 Mikania microphylla Sch.Bip. ex Baker
 Mikania speciosa DC.
 Mikania sessilifolia DC.
 Moquinia polymorpha DC.
 Oligoneuron rigidum Small (= Solidago rigida L.)
 Piptocarpha notata Baker
 Piptocarpha rotundifolia Baker
 Rudbeckia spp. L.
 Sonchus arvensis L.
 Senecio brasiliensis Less.
 Solidago chilensis Meyen
 Symphyotrichum novae-angliae (L.) G.L.Nesom
 Taraxacum officinale Weber
 Trichogonia salviaefolia Gardner
 Trixis antimenorrhoea Mart. ex Baker
 Verbesina alternifolia Britton ex Kearney
 Vernonia apiculata Mart. ex DC.
 Vernonia argyrophylla Less.
 Vernonia diffusa Less.
 Vernonia herbacea Rusby
 Vernonia lacunosa Mart. ex DC.
 Vernonia linearis D.Don ex Hook. et Arn.
 Vernonia patens Kunth
 Vernonia polyanthes Less..
 Vernonia scorpioides Pers.
 Vernonia virgata Gagnep.
 Zinnia multiflora L.

Bignoniaceae (Trumpet creeper family)
All the plants of this family are found mostly in the tropics or subtropics.
 Campsis radicans Seem. (= Bignonia radicans, or Tecoma radicans)
 Catalpa bignonioides Walter
 Catalpa speciosa Warder ex Engelm.
 Cybistax antisyphilitica (Mart.) Mart.
 Handroanthus albus
 Handroanthus impetiginosus
 Jacaranda brasiliana Pers.
 Jacaranda caroba Hort. ex Lem.
 Jacaranda decurrens Cham.
 Jacaranda paucifoliolata Mart. ex DC.
 Memora glaberrima K.Schum.
 Memora nodosa Miers
 Podranea ricasoliana (Tanfani) T. Sprague
 Pyrostegia ignea Presl
 Pyrostegia venusta Miers
 Tabebuia aurea
 Tabebuia chrysotricha
 Tabebuia heptaphylla (Vell.) Toledo
 Tabebuia ochracea
 Tabebuia rosea (Bertol.) DC.
 Tabebuia roseo-alba
 Tabebuia serratifolia
 Tabebuia vellosoi Toledo
 Zeyheria digitalis (Vell.) Hoehne et Kuhlm.

Bixaceae (Achiote family)
 Bixa orellana L.

Bombacaceae (see also Malva family)
 Bombax campestre K.Schum.
 Bombax tomentosum A.Juss.
 Chorisia speciosa A.St.-Hil.
 Eriotheca gracilipes (K.Schum.) A.Robyns
 Pseudobombax grandiflorum (Cav.) A.Robyns

Boraginaceae   (Borage or Forget-me-not family) 
 Anchusa strigosa Banks & Sol.
 Auxemma glazioviana Taub.
 Auxemma oncocalyx Taub.
 Borago officinalis L.
 Cerinthe major L.
 Cordi alliodora Cham.
 Cordia campestris Warm.
 Cordia corymbosa G.Don
 Cordia hypoleuca DC.
 Cordia insignis Cham.
 Cordia leucocephala Moric.
 Cordia nodosa Lam.
 Cordia trichotoma (Vell.) Steud.
 Cordia verbenacea DC.
 Echium plantagineum L.
 Echium simplex DC.
 Echium virescens DC.
 Echium wildpretii H.Pearson ex Hook.f.
 Symphytum brachycalyx Boiss.
 Phacelia tanacetifolia Benth.
 Patagonula americana L.

Brassicaceae (Mustard family or cabbage family)
 Brassica campestris L.
 Brassica juncea Coss.
 Brassica napus L.
 Brassica oleracea L. var. botrytis L.
 Brassica oleracea L. var. capitata
 Brassica oleracea L. var. gemnifera
 Brassica oleracea L. var. gongylodes
 Eruca sativa Mill.
 Lobularia maritima (L.) Desv.
 Sinapis alba L.

Caesalpinioideae
 Apuleia molaris Spruce ex Benth.
 Bauhinia forficata Link
 Cassia ferruginea (Schrad.) DC.
 Cassia grandis L.f.
 Caesalpinia echinata Lam.
 Caesalpinia ferrea Mart.
 Caesalpinia peltophoroides Benth.
 Caesalpinia pyramidalis Tul.
 Caesalpinia microphylla  Mart.
 Copaifera langsdorffii Desf.
 Copaifera oblongifolia Mart. ex Hayne
 Delonix regia Raf.
 Hymenaea courbaril var. stilbocarpa (Hayne) Y.T.Lee et Langenh.
 Schizolobium parahyba (Vell.) Blake
 Schotia brachypetala Sond. 
 Sclerolobium aureum Baill.
 Sclerolobium paniculatum Vogel
 Senna martiana (Benth.) H.S.Irwin et Barneby
 Senna multijuga (Rich.) H.S.Irwin et Barneby
 Senna speciosa Roxb.
 Senna splendida (Vogel) H.S.Irwin et Barneby

Cannabaceae (Hemp Family)
 Celti brasiliensis Planch.
 Trema micrantha (L.) Blume

Capparaceae (Caper family)
 Cleome gynandra L.

Caprifoliaceae    (Honeysuckle family)
 Lonicera japonica Thunb.  ex A.Murray bis

Caryocaraceae
All the plants of this family are found only in the neotropics.
 Caryoca brasiliense Cambess.

Caryophyllaceae (Carnation family)
 Saponaria officinalis L.

Celastraceae  (staff vine or bittersweet family)
 Maytenus boaria Molina

Chrysobalanaceae
found in tropics or sub-tropics
 Couepia grandiflora Benth.
 Parinari obtusifolia Hook.f.
 Hirtella glandulosa Spreng.
 Hirtella martiana Hook.f.

Clethraceae
 Clethra scabra Pers.

Clusiaceae
 Kielmeyera coriacea Mart. & Zucc.

Cochlospermaceae
 Cochlospermum regium Pilg.

Combretaceae
 Terminalia argentea Mart.
 Terminalia brasiliensis Eichl.
 Terminalia fagifolia Mart.

Commelinaceae
 Commelina agraria Kunth
 Tradescantia virginica L.

Convolvulaceae  (Bindweed or morning glory family)
 Ipomoea purpurea Roth
 Ipomoea batatoides Benth.
 Jacquemontia blanchetii Moric.
 Rivea corymbosa (L.) Hallier f.

Cucurbitaceae  (Melon, cucumber, calabash, squash family)
 Cayaponia ficifolia Cogn.
 Citrullus vulgaris Schrad. C.lanatus Nakai
 Cucumis melo L.
 Cucumis sativus L.
 Cucurbita maxima Duchesne
 Cucurbita pepo L.
 Luffa cylindrica M.Roem.

Cunoniaceae
 Eucryphia cordifolia Cav.
 Eucryphia lucida (Labill.) Baill.
 Lamonia speciosa (Cambess.) L.B.Sm.
 Weinmannia trichosperma Ruiz & Pav.

Dilleniaceae
 Curatella americana L.
 Davilla rugosa Poir.

Ebenaceae
 Diospyros kaki L.f.

Elaeocarpaceae
 Crinodendron patagua Mol.

Ericaceae (Blueberry, Heather family)
 Arctostaphylos uva-ursi (L.) Spreng.
 Calluna vulgaris (L.) Hull
 Erica cinerea L.
 Vaccinium angustifolium Aiton
 Vaccinium corymbosum L.
 Oxydendrum arboreum (L.) DC.

Erythroxylaceae (Coca family)
 Erythroxylum campestre A.St.-Hil.
 Erythroxylum suberosum A.St.-Hil.
 Erythroxylum tortuosum Mart.

Escalloniaceae
 Escallonia montevidensis DC.

Euphorbiaceae  (Spurge family)
 Alchornea iricurana Casar.
 Alchornea triplinervia (Spreng.) Müll.Arg.
 Aleurites fordii Hemsl.
 Croton floribundus Spreng.
 Croton macrobothrys Baill.
 Croton salutaris Casar.
 Dalechampia humilis Müll.Arg.
 Euphorbia mellifera Seub.
 Euphorbia pulcherrima Willd. ex Klotzsch
 Julocroton triqueter Baill.
 Phyllanthus acidus (L.) Skeels
 Ricinus communis L.
 Sapium sebiferum (L.) Roxb.

Faboideae (Legume family)
 Andira inermis (Wright) DC.
 Amburana cearensis (= Torresea cearensis M.Allemão) (M.Allemão) A.C.Smith
 Centrolobium robustum Mart. ex Benth.
 Gliricidia sepium (Jacq.) Steud
 Geoffraea spinosa Jacq.
 Machaerium acutifolium Vogel
 Machaerium scleroxylon Tul.
 Medicago sativa L.
 Melilotus alba Medik.
 Melilotus officinalis Lam.
 Myrocarpus frondosus M.Allemão
  Sweetia fruticosa var. fruticosa Spreng. (= Ferreirea spectabilis M.Allemão)
  Trifolium pratense L.
  Trifolium repens L.

Flacourtiaceae
 Aberia caffra Harv. et Sond.

Salicaceae
 Banara parviflora Benth.
 Casearia decandra Jacq.
 Casearia sylvestris Sw.

Hamamelidaceae
 Liquidambar styraciflua L.

Iridaceae
 Crocus vernus (L.) Hill

Lamiaceae  (Mint family)
 Agastache foeniculum Kuntze
 Agastache nepetoides
 Eriope crassipes Benth.
 Hyptis brevipes Poit.
 Hyptis cana Pohl ex Benth.
 Hyptis nudicaulis Benth.
 Hyptis suaveolens Poit.
 Hyptis umbrosa Salzm. ex Benth.
 Lavandula spp. L.
 Leonurus cardiaca L.
 Leonurus sibiricus L.
 Monarda didyma L.
 Monarda fistulosa L.
 Nepeta cataria L.
 Nepeta × faassenii Nepeta mussinii Spreng. ex Henckel
 Nepeta siberica (= Nepeta macrantha, Dracocephalum sibiricum)
 Pycnanthemum tenuifolium Schrad.
 Pycnanthemum verticillatum Pursh var. pilosum (Nutt.) T.S.Cooperrider
 Pycnanthemum virginianum Trel. ex Branner et Coville
 Salvia splendens Ker Gawl.
 Satureja thymbra L.
 Stachys byzantina K.Koch
 Thymbra spicata L.
 Thymus capitatus (L.) Hoffmanns. & Link
 Thymus serpyllum L.
 Vitex sellowiana Cham.

Lauraceae (Laurel family)
 Beilschmiedia berteroana (Gay) Kosterm.
 Nectandra cuspidata Nees et Mart. ex Nees
 Nectandra rigida Nees
 Persea americana Mill.
 Persea gratissima Gaertn.
 Ocotea kuhlmanni Vattimo
 Ocotea pretiosa Mez

Lecythidaceae
 Cariniana legalis Kuntze
 Cariniana estrellensis Kuntze

Liliaceae (Lily family)
 Smilax medica Schltdl. et Cham.
 Smilax officinalis Griseb.

Lythraceae
 Cuphea carthaginensis Macbride
 Cuphea ingrata Cham. et Schltdl.
 Cuphea linarioides Cham. et Schltdl.
 Cuphea mesostemon Koehne
 Heimi myrtifolia Hort.Berol. ex Cham. et Schltdl.
 Lafoensia pacari A.St.-Hil.
 Lagerstroemia indica L.

Magnoliaceae (Magnolia and tulip tree family)
 Liriodendron tulipifera L.

Malpighiaceae
All the plants of this family are found in the neotropics.
 Banisteriopsis campestris (A.Juss.) Little
 Banisteriopsis clausseniana (A.Juss.) W.R.Anderson et B.Gates
 Banisteriopsis gardneriana (A.Juss.) W.R.Anderson et B.Gates
 Banisteriopsis pubipetala (Juss) Cuatrec.
 Byrsonima crassa Nied.
 Byrsonima crassifolia L.Rich
 Byrsonima coccolobifolia Kunth
 Byrsonima intermedia A.Juss.
 Byrsonima subterranea Brade et Markgr.
 Byrsonima verbascifolia Rich. ex Juss.
 Heteropteris aceroides Griseb.

Malvaceae (Malva family)
 Dombeya rotundifolia (Hochst.) Planch.
 Pavonia malvaviscoides A.St.-Hil.
 Pavonia rosa-campestris A.St.-Hil.
 Pavonia speciosa Kunth

Meliaceae (Mahogany family)
 Cedrela fissilis Vell.
 Cedrela odorata Vell.

Mimosoideae
 Acacia farnesiana (L.) Willd.
 Acacia paniculata Willd.
 Acacia plumosa Mart. ex Colla
 Albizia polyantha (Spreng.f.) G.P.Lewis (= Pithecelobium multiflorum (Kunth) Benth.)
 Albizia polycephala (Benth.) Killip ex Record (= Pithecellobium polycephalum Benth.)
 Anadenanthera colubrina (Vell.) Brenan var. cebil (Griseb.) Altschul (= Anadenanthera macrocarpa (Benth.) Brean)
 Anadenanthera contorta (Benth.) Brenan
 Anadenanthera falcata Speg. (= Piptadenia falcata Benth.)
 Anadenanthera peregrina Speg.
 Calliandra dysantha Benth.
 Enterolobium contortisiliquum (Vell.) Morong
 Enterolobium gummiferum (Mart.) Macbride
 Inga affinis DC.
 Inga edulis Mart.
 Inga marginata Willd.
 Inga paterno Harms
 Inga sessilis Mart.
 Leucaena glauca Benth.
 Mimosa acutistipula Benth.
 Mimosa bimucronata Kuntze
 Mimosa caesalpiniaefolia Benth.
 Mimosa laticifera Rizzini et N.F.Mattos
 Mimosa multipinna Benth.
 Piptadenia gonoacantha Benth.
 Piptadenia paniculata Benth.
 Pithecolobium avaremotemo Mart.
 Pithecolobium diversifolium Benth.
 Pithecolobium dumosum Benth. (= Chloroleucon dumosum (Benth.) G.P.Lewis)
 Pithecellobium inopinatum (Harms) Ducke
 Stryphnodendron adstringens (Mart.) Coville
 Stryphnodendron obovatum Benth.

Myrsinaceae
 Rapanea ferruginea Mez (= Caballeria ferruginea Ruiz et Pav.)
 Rapanea lancifolia Mez
 Rapanea umbellata Mez

Myrtaceae (Myrtle family)
 Amomyrtus meli (Phil.) D.Legrand & Kausel
 Campomanesia adamantium Blume
 Campomanesia crenata O.Berg
 Campomanesia guazumaefolia Blume
 Campomanesia pubescens O.Berg
 Campomanesia xanthocarpa O.Berg
 Corymbia citriodora (Hook.) K.D. Hill & L.A. Johnson
 Genus Eucalyptus L'Her., especially the following species:
 Eucalyptus alba;
 Eucalyptus camaldulensis;
 Eucalyptus citriodora;
 Eucalyptus corymbosa;
 Eucalyptus drepanophylla;
 Eucalyptus globulus;
 Eucalyptus maculata;
 Eucalyptus melliodora;
 Eucalyptus microcorys;
 Eucalyptus oleosa;
 Eucalyptus paniculata;
 Eucalyptus citriodora;
 Eucalyptus redunca;
 Eucalyptus scabra;
 Eucalyptus tereticornis;
 Eucalyptus triantha;
 Eucalyptus wandoo.
 Eugenia brasiliensis Lam.
 Eugenia caryophyllata Thunb. (= Syzygium aromaticum (L.) Merr. et Perry)
 Eugenia convexinervia D.Legrand
 Eugenia dombeyana DC.
 Eugenia dysenterica DC.
 Eugenia hyemalis Cambess.
 Eugenia multicostata D.Legrand
 Eugenia pyriformis Cambess.
 Eugenia uniflora L.
 Myrceugenia euosma (O.Berg) D.Legrand
 Myrcia rostrata DC.
 Myrciaria cauliflora (Mart.) O.Berg
 Myrciaria glomerata O.Berg
 Leptospermum scoparium J.R.Forst. & G.Forst.
 Luma apiculata (DC.) Burret
 Metrosideros umbellata Cav.
 Psidium araca Raddi
 Psidium cinereum  Mart. ex DC.
 Psidium firmum O.Berg
 Psidium guajava L.

Ochnaceae
 Ouratea castaneifolia (DC.) Engl.
 Ouratea floribunda Engl.
 Ouratea spectabilis Engl.
 Ouratea nana Engl.

Oleaceae (Olive family)
 Olea europaea L.
 Ligustrum imatophyllum Ligustrum japonicum Thunb.

Oxalidaceae
 Averrhoa carambola L.

Polygonaceae
 Antigonon leptopus — Hook. et Arn.  
 Eriogonum fasciculatum— Benth.
 Eriogonum giganteum — S.Wats.
 Fagopyrum esculentum (buckwheat) — Moench
 Fagopyrum sagittatum — Gilib.
 Polygonum punctatum — Raf.
 Reynoutria japonica (syn. Polygonum cuspidatum) – Japanese knotweed

Passifloraceae (Passion flower family)
 Passiflora haematostigma Mast.
 Passiflora pohlii Mast.

Poaceae(Gramineae)
 Paspalum notatum Flüggé
 Saccharum officinarum L.
 Zea mays L.

Proteaceae
 Banksia integrifolia L.f.
 Banksia sessilis (Knight) A.R.Mast & K.R.Thiele
 Gevuina (Molina) Gaertn.
 Grevillea banksii R.Br.
 Grevillea robusta A.Cunn. ex R.Br.
 Grevillea rosmarinifolia A.Cunn.
 Grevillea thelemanniana Hueg.
 Protea repens Protea cynaroides Roupala brasiliensis Klotzsch
 Roupala cataractarum Sleumer
 Roupala heterophylla hl
 Roupala montana Willd.
 Roupala tomentosa Pohl
 Knightia excelsa R. Br.

Rhamnaceae (Buckthorn family)

 Hovenia dulcis Thunb.
 Rhamnus polymorpha (Reissek) Weberb.
 Zizyphus joazeiro Mart.

Rosaceae (Rose family)
 Eriobotrya japonica (Thunb.) Lindl.
 Prunus amygdalus L.
 Prunus armeniaca L.
 Prunus avium (L.) L.
 Prunus domestica L.
 Prunus persica (L.) Batsch
 Pyrus communis L.

Rubiaceae (Madder, bedstraw, coffee family)
 Alibertia sessilis K.Schum.
 Borreria verticillata G.Mey.
 Borreria latifolia K.Schum.
 Borreria suaveolens G.Mey.
 Borreria verbenoides Cham. et Schltdl.
 Cephalanthus occidentalis L.
 Chinchona spp. L.
 Coffea arabica L.
 Coutarea hexandra (Jacq.) K.Schum.

Rutaceae
 Genus Citrus L., especially the following species:
 Citrus aurantifolia Swingle
 Citrus limonum Risso
 Citrus medica L.
 Citrus reticulata Blanco
 Citrus sinensis (L.) Osbeck
 Murraya paniculata (L.) Jack

Salicaceae (Willow and poplar family)
 Salix amygdaloides Andersson
 Salix bebbiana Sarg.
 Salix caprea L.
 Salix discolor Muhl.
 Salix nigra Marshall

Sapindaceae (Soapberry family)
 Cupania oblongifolia Mart.
 Cupania vernalis Cambess.
 Dodonaea viscosa Mart.
 Magonia pubescens A.St.-Hil.
 Matayba guianensis Aubl.
 Serjania erecta Radlk.
 Serjania grandifolia  ex Radlk.

Scrophulariaceae
 Buddleja brasiliensis Jacq.
 Buddleja davidii Scrophularia californica Cham. et Schltdl.

Solanaceae (Tomato, potato, egg plant family)
 Acnistus arborescens Schltdl.
 Acnistus cauliflorus Schott
 Solanum paniculatum L.

Styracaceae
 Styrax camporum Pohl
 Styrax ferrugineus Nees et Mart.

Sterculiaceae
 Guazuma ulmifolia Lam.
 Sterculia striata A.St.-Hil. et Naudin
 Dombeya natalensis Sond.
 Dombeya wallichii Benth. et Hook.f.
 Waltheria tomentosa (J.R. et G.Forst.) H.St.John

Tamaricaceae
 Tamarix gallica L.

Tiliaceae (Basswood, linden family)
 Luehea candicans Mart.
 Luehea divaricata Mart.
 Luehea grandiflora Mart.
 Luehea paniculata Mart.
 Luehea rufescens A.St.-Hil.
 Triumfetta semitriloba Jacq.

Urticaceae (Nettle family) 
 Boehmeria caudata Sw.

Verbenaceae  (Verbena family)
 Aegiphila lhotskiana Cham.
 Aegiphila tomentosa Cham.
 Aloysia virgata (Ruiz et Pav.) Juss. (= Lippia urticoides (Cham.) Steud.)
 Lantana camara L.
 Lantana lilacina Desf.
 Lantana trifolia L.
 Lippia alba N.E.Br. ex Britton et P.Wilson
 Lippia candicans Hayek
 Petrea subserrata Cham.
 Petrea volubilis L.
 Zapania citriodora Lam. (= Lippia citriodora (Lam.) Kunth)

Vochysiaceae 
All the plants of this family are found in the neotropics.
 Qualea grandifolia  Mart.
 Qualea multiflora Mart.
 Qualea parviflora Mart.

See also
Toxic honey plants, whose nectar results in toxic honey
Forage (honeybee)
Honeydew source
Nectar source
Northern American nectar sources for honey bees
Pollen source
Melliferous flower
Regional honeys

References

  BRANDÃO, M.; FERREIRA, P. B. D. (1991). Flora Apícola do Cerrado.(Honey flora of Cerrado) Informe Agropecuário 15 (168): 5–7.
  CÂNDIDO, F. A. (1992) As árvores e a apicultura. (Trees and beekeeping.) UFV
  Michigan bee plants
  WIESE, H. (1993) Nova apicultura. (New beekeeping.'') Livraria e Editora Agropecuária

External links

Agriculture-related lists
Beekeeping
Gardening lists
Lists of plants
Sustainable gardening